Kozice  is a village in the administrative district of Gmina Krotoszyce, within Legnica County, Lower Silesian Voivodeship, in southwestern Poland. Prior to 1945 it was part of Germany.

References

Villages in Legnica County